The following table indicates the party of elected officials in Massachusetts:
Governor
Lieutenant Governor
Secretary of the Commonwealth
Attorney General
Treasurer and Receiver-General
Auditor

The table also indicates the historical party composition in the:
Massachusetts Senate
Massachusetts House of Representatives
State delegation to the United States Senate
State delegation to the United States House of Representatives

For years in which a United States presidential election was held, the table indicates which party's nominees received the state's electoral votes, and whether they  won the election or  lost the election.

Each time an official is elected or re-elected, a new box for that official is included to indicate their repeated political party strength.

1780–1843

1844–present

References

See also
 Politics of Massachusetts
 Elections in Massachusetts
 Government of Massachusetts
 United States state legislatures' partisan trend

Party strength
Political Party strength
Massachusetts